Khofnak Mahal is a Hindi horror film of Bollywood directed by Sushil Vyas and produced by Vikram A. Patel. This film was released in 1998 under the banner of V.P. Enterprises.

Plot

Cast
 Raza Murad
 Pramod Moutho
 Usha Khanna
 Narendra Nath
 Javed Khan
 Rakesh Pandey
 Seema Vaz
 Brijesh

References

External links
 

1998 films
1990s Hindi-language films
Indian horror films
1998 horror films
Hindi-language horror films